Sevara Safoeva (born 19 November 2002) is an Uzbekistani group rhythmic gymnast who represented Uzbekistan at the 2020 Summer Olympics.

Career 
Safoeva took up rhythmic gymnastics in 2010 at age seven.

At the 2019 Asian Championships in Thailand, Safoeva and the Uzbekistani group won two gold medals, as well as a silver in the all-around.

Safoeva was also part of the Uzbekistani group that won the all-around at the 2021 Asian Championships, taking the gold in both the 5 balls and 4 clubs + 3 hoops finals.

Safoeva represented her country at the 2018 and 2019 World Championships, where the Uzbekistani group finished seventeenth and fourteenth respectively.

At the 2020 Olympic Games, she competed alongside Kamola Irnazarova, Dinara Ravshanbekova, Kseniia Aleksandrova, and Nilufar Shomuradova. They finished ninth in the qualification round for the group all-around and were the first reserve for the final.

References

External links

Living people
2002 births
People from Navoiy Region
Uzbekistani rhythmic gymnasts
Gymnasts at the 2020 Summer Olympics
Olympic gymnasts of Uzbekistan